A list of notable people from Lorient, France:

Academics
 Jacques Cambry (1749–1807), expert on Celtic France
 Pierre Fatou (1878–1929), mathematician and astronomer
 Irène Frain (b. 1950), novelist, journalist, and historian
 Ernest Hello (1828–1885), Catholic philosopher
 Nicole Le Douarin (b. 1930), developmental biologist

Arts and Music
 Frédéric Adam (1904–1984), conductor and composer
 Auguste Brizeux (1803–1858), poet
 Charles Delioux (1825–1915), composer and pianist
 Marie Dorval (1798–1849), actress
 Camille Guérini (1900–1963), actor
 Viktor Lazlo (b. 1960), singer
 Tristan Le Govic (b. 1976), harp player
 Victor Massé (1822–1884), composer
 Theodore Roussel (1847–1926), painter
 Jacques Vaché (1895–1919), surrealist

Military
 Jacques Andrieux (1917–2005), WWII fighter ace
 François Joseph Bouvet de Précourt (1753–1832), admiral
 Jean-Baptiste Chaigneau (1769–1832), French Navy sailor and adventurer
 Jean-Marie Dutertre (1768–1811), privateer
 Pierre-François Forissier (b.1951), Chief of Staff of the French Navy
 Fernand Louis Armand Marie de Langle de Cary (1849–1927), WWI general
 René Constant Le Marant de Kerdaniel (1777–1862), admiral

Politics
 Pierre-Paul Guieysse (1841–1914), Socialist politician
 François de La Rocque (1885–1946), leader of the Croix de Feu and Parti Social Français
 Robert Le Masson (1365–1443), Chancellor of France
 Jean-Yves Le Drian (b.1947), Socialist politician
 Béatrice Patrie (b.1957), judge and European Parliament member
 Julien Schmaltz (1771–1826), governor of Senegal
 Jules Simon (1814–1896), Moderate Republican politician

Sports
 Mouloud Akloul (b.1983), footballer
 Marc Boutruche (b.1976), footballer
 Philippe Celdran (b.1973), footballer
 Georges Eo (b.1948), football manager
 Yvon Goujon (b.1937), footballer
 Ronan Le Crom (b.1974), footballer
 Christophe Le Roux (b.1969), footballer
 Jérémy Morel (b.1984), footballer
 Nicolas Ouédec (b.1971), footballer
 Hervé Phélippeau (b.1962), runner
 Georges Van Straelen (1956–2012), footballer and coach
 Cyrille Watier (b.1972), footballer
 Cyril Yapi (b.1980), footballer

Other
 Joseph Yves Limantour (1812–1885), merchant in the California sea trade
 Louis Maurice Adolphe Linant de Bellefonds (1799–1883), chief engineer of the Suez Canal
 Raymond Rallier du Baty (1881–1978), sailor and explorer

 
Lorient